First Nations in Ontario constitute many nations.  Common First Nations ethnicities in the province include the Anishinaabe, Haudenosaunee, and the Cree.  In southern portions of this province, there are reserves of the Mohawk, Cayuga, Onondaga, Oneida, Seneca and Tuscarora.
    

 Aamjiwnaang First Nation
 Alderville First Nation
 Algonquins of Pikwàkanagàn First Nation
 Attawapiskat First Nation
 Batchewana First Nation
 Bearfoot Onondaga First Nation
 Beausoleil First Nation
 Beaverhouse First Nation (non-Status)
 Bkejwanong Territory
 Brunswick House First Nation
 Caldwell First Nation
 Chapleau Cree First Nation
 Chippewa of the Thames First Nation
 Chippewas of Georgina Island First Nation
 Chippewas of Kettle & Stony Point
 Chippewas of Mnjikaning First Nation (Rama)
 Chippewas of Nawash
 Chippewas of Saugeen
 Constance Lake First Nation
 Curve Lake First Nation
 Delaware First Nation
 Dokis First Nation
 Flying Post First Nation
 Fort Severn First Nation
 Fort Albany First Nation
 Ojibways of Garden River
 Hiawatha First Nation
 Iskutewizaagegan
 Kingfisher First Nation
 Koocheching First Nation
 Magnetawan First Nation
 Matachewan First Nation
 Mattagami First Nation
 M'Chigeeng First Nation
 Michipicoten First Nation
 Missanabie Cree First Nation
 Mississauga First Nation
 Mississaugas of the Credit
 Mississaugas of Scugog Island
 Mocreebec Indian Government
 Mohawks of Akwesasne
 Mohawks of the Bay of Quinte
 Moose Cree First Nation
 Moose Deer Point First Nation
 Munsee-Delaware Nation
 Namaygoosisagagun First Nation (non-Status)
 Naotkamegwanning Anishinabe First Nation
 Netmizaaggamig Nishnaabeg (Pic Mobert)
 Nipissing First Nation
 Ojibways of Sucker Creek
 Oneida Nation of the Thames
 Poplar Point First Nation
 Sagamok Anishnawbek First Nation
 Serpent River First Nation
 Shawanaga First Nation
 Sheguiandah First Nation
 Sheshegwaning First Nation
 Six Nations of the Grand River
 Taykwa Tagamou
 Temagami First Nation
 Thessalon First Nation
 Wahgoshig First Nation
 Wahnapitae First Nation
 Wahta Mohawks
 Wasauksing First Nation
 Washagamis Bay First Nation
 Whitewater Lake First Nation
 Wikwemikong Unceded First Nation
 Zhiibaahaasing First Nation

First Nations in Northwestern Ontario

 Animbiigoo Zaagi'igan Anishinaabek First Nation
 Anishinaabeg of Naongashiing
 Aroland First Nation
 Atikameksheng Anishnawbek First Nation
 Attawapiskat First Nation
 Bear Lake First Nation
 Big Grassy First Nation
 Biinjitiwaabik Zaaging Anishinaabek First Nation
 Cat Lake First Nation
 Couchiching First Nation
 Deer Lake First Nation
 Eabametoong First Nation
 Eagle Lake First Nation
 Fort Severn First Nation
 Fort William First Nation
 Ginoogaming First Nation
 Grassy Narrows First Nation
 Gull Bay First Nation
 Hornepayne First Nation 
 Kasabonika Lake First Nation
 Kashechewan First Nation
 Keewaywin First Nation
 Kitchenuhmaykoosib Inninuwug First Nation
 Lac des Mille Lacs First Nation
 Lac La Croix First Nation
 Lac Seul First Nation
 Long Lake First Nation
 Marten Falls First Nation
 McDowell Lake First Nation
 Mishkeegogamang First Nation
 Muskrat Dam Lake First Nation
 Naicatchewenin First Nation
 Neskantaga First Nation
 Nibinamik First Nation
 Nigigoonsiminikaaning First Nation
 Niisaachewan Anishinaabe Nation
 North Caribou Lake First Nation
 North Spirit Lake First Nation
 Northwest Angle No. 33 First Nation
 Northwest Angle No. 37 First Nation
 Ojibways of Onigaming
 Ojibways of the Pic River First Nation
 Pays Plat First Nation
 Pikangikum First Nation
 Poplar Hill First Nation
 Rainy River First Nation
 Red Rock Band
 Sachigo Lake First Nation
 Sand Point First Nation
 Sandy Lake First Nation
 Saugeen First Nation
 Seine River First Nation
 Shoal Lake First Nation
 Slate Falls First Nation
 Stanjikoming First Nation
 Wabaseemoong Independent Nation
 Wasauksing First Nation
 Wabigoon First Nation
 Wapekeka First Nation
 Wauzhushk Onigum First Nation
 Wawakapewin First Nation
 Webequie First Nation
 Weenusk First Nation
 Whitesand First Nation
 Wunnumin Lake First Nation

External links
 Chiefs of Ontario organization

 
First Nations